Leptostylum is a genus of flies in the family Tachinidae.

Species
Leptostylum aurata (Townsend, 1927)
Leptostylum curepeiensis (Thompson, 1968)
Leptostylum fasciatum (Curran, 1934)
Leptostylum flavocalyptratum (Wulp, 1890)
Leptostylum griseum (Thompson, 1968)
Leptostylum itaquaquecetubae (Townsend, 1929)
Leptostylum leuconotum (Wulp, 1892)
Leptostylum oligothrix Gudin & Messas, 2018
Leptostylum pulchellum Macquart, 1851

References

Exoristinae
Tachinidae genera
Taxa named by Pierre-Justin-Marie Macquart
Diptera of North America
Diptera of South America